Halil İbrahim Doğan (born 6 October 2000) is a Turkish cyclist, who currently rides for UCI Continental team .

Major results

2017
 2nd Overall Memorial Dimitar Yankov Sunny Beach
2018
 1st  Road race, National Junior Road Championships
 2nd Overall Belgrade Trophy Milan Panić
2019
 1st  Road race, National Under-23 Road Championships
 3rd Overall Tour of Mersin
 7th Bursa Orhangazi Race
2020
 2nd Road race, National Road Championships
 2nd Time trial, National Under-23 Road Championships
 9th Grand Prix Alanya
 10th Grand Prix World's Best High Altitude
2021
 1st  Time trial, National Under-23 Road Championships
 National Road Championships
6th Road race
8th Time trial
 9th Grand Prix Develi
2022
 9th Grand Prix Gündoğmuş

References

External links

2000 births
Living people
Turkish male cyclists
People from Kütahya
21st-century Turkish people